Aegyptus is a mythological king of Egypt.

Aegyptus may also refer to:
 Aegyptus (mythology), other characters in Greek mythology
 Aegyptus (province) or Egypt, a Roman province
 Aegyptus (game), a 1984 play-by-mail game

See also
 Egyptus, a figure in Latter-day Saint theology
 Aegypius